Haderslev is a Danish town in the Region of Southern Denmark with a population of 22,011 (1 January 2022). It is the main town and the administrative seat of Haderslev Municipality and is situated in the eastern part of Southern Jutland. Haderslev is home of Sønderjyske, which is an association football team that plays in the Danish Superliga since 2008. The town is named after King Hader.

History

Overview

Haderslev is situated in a valley, leading from Vojens to Haderslev Fjord and the Baltic Sea.
Haderslev was presumably founded by Vikings at least a century before it was granted status as royal borough in 1292. At that time, it had become one of the main trading centres in Southern Jutland.
In 1327, Haderslevhus, the royal castle, was mentioned for the first time.  It was situated east of the cathedral, in an area still called Slotsgrunden.  In the following centuries the city prospered, building both the Gothic Cathedral and the second castle of Hansborg (burnt in 1644), which was similar to Kronborg.  Due to the plague in Copenhagen, King Christian IV was married there.
In the 16th century, the city became one of the first Scandinavian centres of Lutheranism during the Reformation. Prior to the Second Schleswig War of 1864, Haderslev was situated in the Duchy of Schleswig, a Danish fief, so its history is properly included in the contentious history of Schleswig-Holstein. From 1864 it was part of Prussia, and as such part of the North German Confederation, and from 1871 onwards, part of the German Empire. In the 1920 Schleswig Plebiscite that returned Northern Schleswig to Denmark, 38.6% of Haderslev's inhabitants voted for remaining part of Germany and 61.4% voted for the cession to Denmark. It was formerly the capital of the German Kreis Hadersleben and the Danish Haderslev County.

Buildings in Haderslev
The trademark of Haderslev is unquestionably Haderslev Cathedral, which has existed since the middle of the 13th century, and since 1922 it was the seat of Haderslev Diocese. The town was an important breeding ground for the reformation in Denmark, and as early as 1526 Christian introduced, as the duke of Schleswig-Holstein, the reformation in Haderslev, just eight years before he became King of Denmark.

Another noticeable church is the white-chalked Sankt Severin Church, which lies at the banks of the town's inner pond.

Because of a renovation of the town's oldest houses, it means Haderslev offers a unique collection of houses and buildings from 1400 to the beginning of the 20th century, and the town center's cobbled streets and alleys is very suitable for town strolling.

Once the town used to have a castle named "Haderslevhus", but due to several town fires through the town's history the castle is no longer existent.

Festival
In the public park "Kløften", near the town's center, Kløften Festival is held - a three-day annual festival in the summer. The festival uses one of Haderslev's important trademarks, the red-bricked water tower near the park as its logo.

Education in Haderslev
Three branches of University College South can be found in Haderslev.

Former municipality (1970–2006)
A kommune by the previous name existed 1970–2006. Its last mayor was Hans Peter Geil, a member of the liberal (Venstre) political party.

Neighboring municipalities were Christiansfeld to the north, Vojens to the west, Rødekro to the south, and Assens (on the island of Funen) to the East.

Twin towns – sister cities
Haderslev practices twinning on the municipal level. For the twin towns, see twin towns of Haderslev Municipality.

Notable residents

Nobility 

 Eric Christoffersen of Denmark ( 1307– 1332) King of Denmark from 1321, in 1325 he sought to halt the Counts of Holstein, but was deserted by his troops and confined in Haderslev Castle
 Dorothea of Saxe-Lauenburg  (1511–1571), consort of Christian III from 1525 and Queen consort of Denmark and Norway. Lived in her own courts in Haderslev.
 John II, Duke of Schleswig-Holstein-Haderslev (1521–1580) was the only Duke of Schleswig-Holstein-Haderslev
 Frederick II of Denmark (1534–1588) King of Denmark and Norway and Duke of Schleswig and Holstein from 1559 until his death.
 John II, Duke of Schleswig-Holstein-Sonderburg (1545–1622) was the Duke of Schleswig-Holstein-Sonderburg
 Frederick III of Denmark (1609–1670) king of Denmark and Norway 1648–1670.

The Arts 

 Georg Nikolaus von Nissen  (1761 in Haderslev–1826) music historian and diplomat, author of one of the first biographies of Wolfgang Amadeus Mozart
 Heinrich Hansen (born 1821 Haderslev–1890) was an architectural painter and State Councillor
 Anton Eduard Kieldrup (1826 in Haderslev–1869) was a Danish landscape painter
 Friedrich Deneken (1857 in Hadersleben–1927) a German art historian and museum director
 Ole Kruse (1868 in Haderslev–1948) a Danish-Swedish painter
 Hans Lynge (1906–1988 in Haderslev) a Greenlandic author, painter, politician and sculptor
 Helmuth Ellgaard  (1913–1980) was a German illustrator, artist and journalist
 Torben Ebbesen (born 1945) a Danish sculptor and painter

Public thinking & Public Service 

 Niels Toller (1592–1642) merchant, settled in Norway, the wealthiest person in Christiania
 Henning Stockfleth ( 1610–1664) was a Norwegian cleric and Bishop of Oslo
 Arend Friedrich Wiegmann (1770–1853) was a German pharmacist and botanist
 Heinrich Nissen (born 1839 in Hadersleben–1912) was a German professor of ancient history
 Christian August Volquardsen (born 1840 in Hadersleben–1917) was a German historian.
 Julius Langbehn (1851–1907) was a German art historian and philosopher.
 Günter Weitling (born 1935) a Lutheran theologian, historian, and author
 Marianne Christiansen (born 1963) is a Lutheran bishop of the Diocese of Haderslev
 Erik Jorgensen (1921–2012) was a forester, professor, and inventor of "urban forestry"

Sport 
 Svend Wad (1928–2004) boxer, the Olympic Bronze Medalist at lightweight in London in 1948
 Jørn Krab (born 1945) a Danish rower who competed in the 1968 Summer Olympics
 Preben Krab (born 1952) a Danish rower who competed in the 1968 Summer Olympics 
 Ole Olsen (born 1946) a Danish former international motorcycle speedway rider
 Preben Krab (born 1952) a Danish rower who competed in the 1968 Summer Olympics
 Finn Jensen (born 1957) is a Danish former motorcycle speedway rider
 Patrick Galbraith (born 1986) a Danish professional ice hockey goaltender

Sports 

Haderslev RC, rugby club

Gallery

References

External links
Haderslev Cathedral, description  

 Municipality's official website

 
Municipal seats of the Region of Southern Denmark
Municipal seats of Denmark
Cities and towns in the Region of Southern Denmark
Haderslev Municipality